"I Don't Dance" is a song performed by actor-singers Lucas Grabeel and Corbin Bleu in the television movie High School Musical 2, released in 2007. It is one of seven songs from the soundtrack High School Musical 2 to reach the Billboard Hot 100. It was also named as the official theme song for the 2007 Little League World Series.

Scene in High School Musical 2
The song is performed whilst the Wildcats, led by Chad (Corbin Bleu) play baseball against the Lava Springs staff. Ryan (Lucas Grabeel) challenges Chad to perform in the annual Lava Springs talent show, but Chad declines, stating that he doesn't dance. Ryan thinks dancing takes as much game as baseball, and tries to prove it to Chad. The moral of "I Don't Dance" is that even though "you may not think you're good at something, you'll never know for sure until you try." I Don't Dance is also said to be a metaphor for sexuality, and the tension between Ryan and Chad, this is partially proven near the ending of the song where the two switch clothes.

Critical reception
The Village Voice'''s Tom Breihan called the song "the movie's best dance-number" and commented how the routine managed to "include rapping and swing-dancing, which sort of blew [his] mind." Reviewer Erin Nolan referred to the song as "insanely catchy." Not all reviews were positive though. The reviewer for the Charlotte Observer called the tune "excruciating," The New York Times felt that the "HSM2 was the shallowest movie he had ever seen" although the music was "a superb idea, as it plays off both the Latinization of the major leagues (by letting a little salsa into the hip-hop) and the spectacular pitcher-batter operetta showdowns of recent seasons," but that the camera work let the scene down noting that "viewers never get a sustained look at the choreography ... and for that reason it’s hard to appreciate specific dancers or their clever configuration."

Promotional video
The promotional video for the song blends scenes from the movie's dance sequence with clips of notable Major League Baseball players including Ryan Howard, Cole Hamels, Jimmy Rollins, Jake Peavy, Justin Verlander, Craig Biggio, David Eckstein, So Taguchi, Bronson Arroyo, CC Sabathia, Nick Swisher, Jeff Francoeur, Brian McCann, B.J. Upton, Bill Hall, J. J. Hardy, Luis Gonzalez, Takashi Saito, Torii Hunter, Shane Victorino, and Nomar Garciaparra. The video was shown in Major and Minor League ballparks throughout the country during the summer of 2007, and it was showcased on The Baseball Youth Road Trip, a summer tour presented by the Major League Baseball Players Association stopping at youth baseball tournaments and Minor League Baseball parks. The I Don't Dance'' music video shown at over sixty youth baseball events during the Road Trip, culminating at the Little League World Series, where it served as the theme song for the games.

Formats and track listings
A promotional CD single for the song was released in Portugal but without an English version of "I Don't Dance" and a music video was also made. The music video can be seen on High School Musical 2 2-Disc Deluxe Dance Edition DVD.

Chart performance
It made its debut on the Billboard Hot 100 at number 74 in the chart for September 1, 2007.

Charts

References

2007 songs
2007 Little League World Series
Baseball songs and chants
Corbin Bleu songs
Lucas Grabeel songs
Songs from High School Musical (franchise)
Songs written by Matthew Gerrard
Songs written by Robbie Nevil
Walt Disney Records singles
Song recordings produced by Matthew Gerrard
Songs about dancing